Walter Curt Behrendt (December 16, 1884 – April 26, 1945) was a German-American architect and active advocate of German modernism.  He was an authority on city planning and housing, editor of Die Form, and author of The Victory of the New Building Style among many other works.

Behrendt was born in Metz, emigrated to the U.S. in 1934 to teach at Dartmouth College through the help of his friend Lewis Mumford, and died in Norwich, Vermont.

Selected literary works 

 Alfred Messel,  intro. Karl Scheffler. Berlin: Bruno Cassirer, 1911. Reprint: Gebr.Mann, Berlin 1998.
 Die einheitliche Blockfront als Raumelement im Stadtbau. Berlin: Bruno Cassirer, 1911.
 Der Kampf um den Stil im Kunstgewerbe und in der Architektur.  Stuttgart/Berlin: Deutsche Verlags-Anstalt, 1920.
 Der Sieg des neuen Baustils.  Stuttgart: Akademischer Verlag Dr. Fritz Wedekind & Co., 1927. Translated as: The Victory of the New Building Style, intro. Detlef Mertins, trans. Harry F. Mallgrave. Texts & Documents. Los Angeles: Getty Research Institute, 2000.
 Modern Building. Its Nature, Problems, and Forms.  New York: Harcourt, Brace and Co., 1937.

References 
 Mertins, Detlef.  "Introduction," in Behrendt, The Victory of the New Building Style, pp. 1–84.
 Samson, Miles David.  "Lewis Mumford, Walter Curt Behrendt, and the Modern Movement in Germany," Journal of the Society of Architectural Historians 55, no. 2 (May 1996): 126–139.
 Gutschow, Kai Konstanty. "Revising the Paradigm: German Modernism as the Search for a National Architecture in the Writings of Walter Curt Behrendt." (M.Arch) Thesis, University of California at Berkeley, 1993.
 Scalvini, Maria-Luisa and Maria G. Sandri.  L'immagine storiografica dell'architettura contemporanea da Platz a Giedion.  Rome: Officina Edizione, 1984.

External links 
 
 Walter Curt Behrendt papers, 1910–1945 Held by the Department of Drawings & Archives,Avery Architectural & Fine Arts Library, Columbia University
 SAH.org – Society of Architectural Historians at www.sah.org (short biography)

1884 births
1945 deaths
20th-century German architects
20th-century American architects
Dartmouth College faculty
German emigrants to the United States
People from Alsace-Lorraine
People from Metz